Holochilus brasiliensis, also known as the Brazilian marsh rat or web-footed marsh rat, is a species of semiaquatic rodent from South America. It is found in northeastern Argentina, southern and eastern Brazil and in eastern Uruguay.

Description
The fur is luxuriant and dense. The dorsal colour is cinnamon, the flanks are a brighter orange and the underparts a paler orange, apart from a white throat and chest and some white in the unguinal area.

Distribution and habitat
H. brasiliensis is semiaquatic and occurs in eastern and southern Brazil, Uruguay, eastern Paraguay and northeastern Argentina in the Atlantic Forest Ecoregion. It is typically found in swampy grassland and woodland areas bordering rivers in the rainforest, both on the coastal plain and inland.

Ecology
A nocturnal species, H. brasiliensis moves freely on land and in the water. It is seldom caught in live traps but is frequently caught by barn owls and mammalian carnivores. It feeds on tender shoots and mostly breeds after rains in spring and summer, with litters of three to six young having been recorded. It can be a pest in sugar cane and rice crops.

Status
The International Union for Conservation of Nature has assessed this species as being of "least concern". This is because it has a wide range, is able to adapt to modified habitats, is present in a number of reserves and other protected areas, and the population is large and seems stable.

References

Holochilus
Mammals of Argentina
Mammals of Brazil
Mammals of Uruguay
Mammals described in 1819
Taxa named by Anselme Gaëtan Desmarest